The Exocet is a French-built anti-ship missile whose various versions can be launched from surface vessels, submarines, helicopters and fixed-wing aircraft.

Etymology

The missile's name was given by M. Guillot, then the technical director at Nord Aviation. It is the French word for flying fish, from the Latin exocoetus, a transliteration of the Greek name for the fish that sometimes flew into a boat:  (exōkoitos), literally "lying down outside, sleeping outside".

Description

The Exocet is built by MBDA, a European missile company. Development began in 1967 by Nord as a ship-launched weapon named the MM38. A few years later, Aerospatiale and Nord merged. The basic body design was based on the Nord AS-30 air-to-ground tactical missile. The sea-launched MM38 entered service in 1975, whilst the air-launched AM39 Exocet began development in 1974 and entered service with the French Navy five years later in 1979.

The relatively compact missile is designed for attacking small- to medium-size warships (e.g., frigates, corvettes, and destroyers), although multiple hits are effective against larger vessels, such as aircraft carriers. It is guided inertially in mid-flight and turns on active radar homing late in its flight to find and hit its target. As a countermeasure against air defence around the target, it maintains a very low altitude while inbound, staying just one to two meters above the sea surface. Due to the effect of the radar horizon, this means that the target may not detect an incoming attack until the missile is only   from impact. This leaves little time for reaction and stimulated the design of close-in weapon systems (CIWS).

The submarine-launched version places the missile inside a launch capsule.

Replacement Future Cruise/Anti-Ship Weapon is under development.

Versions

 
The Exocet has been manufactured in versions including:
 MM38 (surface-launched) – deployed on warships. Range: 42 km. No longer produced. A coast defence version known as "Excalibur" was developed in the United Kingdom and deployed in Gibraltar from 1985 to 1997.
 AM38 (helicopter-launched – tested only)
 AM39 (air-launched) – B2 Mod 2: deployed on 14 types of aircraft (combat jets, maritime patrol aircraft, helicopters). Range between 50 and 70 km, depending on the altitude and the speed of the launch aircraft.
 SM39 (submarine-launched) – B2 Mod 2: deployed on submarines. The missile is housed inside a watertight launched capsule (véhicule Sous marin, VSM), which is fired from the submarine's torpedo tubes. On leaving the water, the capsule is ejected and the missile's motor is ignited. It then behaves like an MM40. The missile will be fired at depth, which makes it particularly suitable for discreet submarine operations.
 MM40 (surface-launched) – Block 1, Block 2 and Block 3: deployed on warships and in coastal batteries. Range: 72 km for the Block 2, in excess of 200 km for the Block 3.

MM40 Block 3
In February 2004, the Direction Générale pour l'Armement (DGA) notified MBDA of a contract for the design and production of a new missile, the MM40 Block 3. It has an improved range, in excess of —through the use of a turbojet engine, and includes four air intakes to provide continuous airflow to the power plant during high-G manoeuvres.

The Block 3 missile accepts GPS guidance system waypoint commands, which allow it to attack naval targets from different angles and to strike land targets, giving it a marginal role as a land-attack missile. The Block 3 Exocet is lighter than the previous MM40 Block 2 Exocet.

45 Block 3 Exocets were ordered by the French Navy in December 2008 for its ships which were carrying Block 2 missiles, namely Horizon-class and Aquitaine-class frigates. From 2021, the Block 3 upgrade was also being extended to three of the La Fayette-class frigates selected for life extension refits. These are not to be new productions but the conversion of older Block 2 missiles to the Block 3 standard. An MM40 Block 3 last qualification firing took place on the Île du Levant test range on 25 April 2007 and series manufacturing began in October 2008. The first firing of the Block 3 from a warship took place on 18 March 2010, from the French Navy air defence frigate . In 2012, a new motor, designed and manufactured in Brazil by the Avibras company in collaboration with MBDA, was tested on an MM40 missile of the Brazilian Navy.

Besides the French, the Block 3 has been ordered by several other navies including that of Greece, the UAE, Chile, Peru, Qatar, Oman, Indonesia and Morocco.

The chief competitors to the Exocet are the US-made Harpoon, the Italian Otomat, the Swedish RBS15 and the Chinese Yingji series.

MM40 Block 3c

The “Block 3c” variant integrates a digital Radio Frequency (RF) seeker to the missile that has been developed by Thales. The Block 3c variant is described as more resistant to jamming systems and may be able to recognize surface vessels, based on the use of advanced wave forms. Block 3 missiles introduced a longer 200 kilometer range but retained the same RF seeker as Block 2. This technology remained non-digital.

The Block 3c variant is to begin delivery to the French Navy in December 2022 with 55 new missiles ordered in addition to 45 “MM40 Block 3c kits” to update existing Block 3 missiles to the Block 3c configuration.

Operational history

Falklands War

In 1982, during the Falklands War, Argentine Navy Dassault-Breguet Super Étendard warplanes carrying the AM39 air-launched version of the Exocet caused damage which sank the Royal Navy destroyer  on 4 May 1982. Two more Exocets struck the 15,000-ton merchant ship  on 25 May. Two MM38 ship-to-ship missiles were removed from the destroyer ARA Seguí, a former US Navy  destroyer, and transferred to an improvised launcher for land use. The missiles were launched on 12 June 1982 and one hit the destroyer .

HMS Sheffield
Sheffield was a Type 42 guided missile destroyer.  On 4 May 1982, Sheffield was at defence watches (second-degree readiness) the southernmost of three Type 42 destroyers when she was hit by one of two AM39 air-launched Exocet missiles fired by Argentine Super Étendard strike fighters. The second missile splashed into the sea about half-mile off her port beam.

It appears that the warhead did not explode. Twenty members of her crew were killed and 26 injured. The ship foundered while under tow on 10 May. The loss of Sheffield was a deep shock to the British public and government.

The official Royal Navy Board of Inquiry Report stated that evidence indicates that the warhead did not detonate. During the 4 and a half days that the ship remained afloat, five salvage inspections were made and a number of photographs were taken. Members of the crew were interviewed and testimony was given by Exocet specialists (the Royal Navy had 15 surface combat ships armed with Exocets in the Falklands War). There was no evidence of an explosion, although burning propellant from the rocket motor caused fires which could not be checked as firefighting equipment had been put out of action.

SS Atlantic Conveyor
Atlantic Conveyor was a 14,950 ton roll-on/roll-off container ship that had been hastily converted to carry aircraft on her deck. It was carrying helicopters and supplies, including cluster bombs. Two Exocet missiles had been fired at a frigate, but had been confused by its defences and re-targeted the Atlantic Conveyor. Both missiles struck the container ship on her port quarter and warheads exploded either after penetrating the ship's hull, or on impact. Witness Prince Andrew reported that debris caused "splashes in the water about a quarter of a mile away". Twelve men were killed and the survivors were taken to HMS Hermes. Atlantic Conveyor sank while under tow three days later. 

HMS Invincible
On 30 May, two Super Étendards, one carrying Argentina's last remaining air-launched Exocet, escorted by four Douglas A-4C Skyhawks each with two 500 lb bombs, took off to attack the carrier HMS Invincible. Argentine intelligence had sought to determine the position of Invincible from analysis of aircraft flight routes from the task force to the islands.  However, the British had a standing order that all aircraft conduct a low level transit when leaving or returning to the ship to disguise her position.  This tactic compromised the Argentine attack, which focused on a group of escorts 40 miles south of the main body of ships. Two of the attacking Skyhawks were shot down: one by a Sea Dart missile fired by HMS Exeter, and while the fate of the Exocet has never been established beyond doubt, the crew of HMS Avenger claimed that their 4.5-inch gun had shot it down.  No damage was caused to any British vessels.

HMS Glamorgan
HMS Glamorgan was a  destroyer launched in 1964. The first attempt to fire a missile did not result in a launch; on the second attempt, a missile was launched but did not acquire the target. The third attempt resulted in a missile tracking Glamorgan. The incoming Exocet missile was also spotted on Glamorgan and a turn was ordered to present the stern to the missile.

The turn prevented the missile from striking the ship's side and penetrating the hull; instead, it hit the deck coaming at an angle, near the port Seacat missile launcher, skidded along the deck and exploded, making a  hole in the hangar deck and a  hole in the galley below.  Fourteen crew members were killed.

Post–Falklands war
In the years after the Falklands War, it was revealed that the British government and the Secret Intelligence Service (MI6) had been extremely concerned at the time by the perceived inadequacy of the Royal Navy's anti-missile defences against the Exocet and its potential to tip the naval war decisively in favour of the Argentine forces. A scenario was envisioned in which one or both of the force's two aircraft carriers ( and ) were destroyed or incapacitated by Exocet attacks, which would make recapturing the Falklands much more difficult.

Actions were taken to contain the Exocet threat. A major intelligence operation was initiated to prevent the Argentine Navy from acquiring more of the weapons on the international market. The operation included British intelligence agents claiming to be arms dealers able to supply large numbers of Exocets to Argentina, who diverted Argentina from pursuing sources which could genuinely supply a few missiles. France denied deliveries of Exocet AM39s purchased by Peru to avoid the possibility that Peru might supply them to Argentina because they knew that payment would be made with credit from the Central Bank of Peru. British intelligence had detected the guarantee was a deposit of two hundred million dollars from the Andean Lima Bank, an owned subsidiary of the Italian Banco Ambrosiano.

Iran–Iraq War

During the Iran–Iraq War, on 17 May 1987, an Iraqi aircraft identified as a Dassault Mirage F1 fired two Exocet missiles at the American frigate .  Both missiles struck the port side of the ship near the bridge. No weapons were fired in defence: The Phalanx CIWS remained in standby mode and the Mark 36 SRBOC countermeasures were not armed. Thirty-seven United States Navy personnel were killed and twenty-one were wounded.  The ship did not sink, and was eventually repaired.

Operators

Current operators
 
 Argentine Navy – MM38, MM40 and AM39
 
 Royal Brunei Navy – MM38, MM40
 
 Bulgarian Navy
 
 Brazilian Navy – MM38, MM40 Block 2 and AM39, SM-39
 
 Cameroon Navy – MM38, MM40 (on P-48S (Bakassi) craft)
 
 
 
 Cyprus Navy – MM40
 : MM40
 : AM39, MM38 & MM40
 
 French Navy – MM38, MM40, AM39, SM39
 
 German Navy – To be replaced with the RBS 15.
 
Hellenic Navy – MM38, MM40 Block 2/3
Hellenic Air Force – AM39 block 2
 
 Indonesian Navy – MM38, MM40 Block 2, MM40 Block 3
 
Indian Navy (on )
 
 
 
 Royal Malaysian Navy – MM38, MM40 Block 2 and SM39 (on s)
 
 Royal Moroccan Navy – MM38, MM40 Block 2/3
Moroccan Air Force – AM39
 
 
Pakistan Navy – SM39 on Agosta 90B (Khalid)-class submarines
Sea King helicopters.
Pakistan Air Force – on the Mirage 5PA3
 
 Peruvian Navy – MM38 on s, AM39 Block 2 on ASH-3D Sea Kings and Mirage 2000P, MM40 Block 3 on s
 
 : South African Navy – MM40 Block 2 on s. The navy plans to upgrade to the Block 3 missile.
 
 Royal Thai Navy – MM38
 
 MM-40 Exocet for the La Combattante III-class fast attack craft
 
MM38
 
 UAE Navy MM40 Block 3 on 
 
 National Navy of Uruguay – MM38 on s

Former operators
 
 Belgian Navy operated Exocet on its s. These warships were all sold in 2008 to Bulgaria.
 
 Georgian Navy
 
 Iraqi Air Force – operated the Exocet on its Mirage F1s and Super Étendards during the Iran–Iraq War.
 Iraqi Navy - used on Super Frelon helicopters during the war with Iran.
 
 Royal Navy - operated Exocet until the last MM38 armed surface vessel was decommissioned in 2002.
 
 Venezuelan Air Force – operated Exocet on its Dassault Mirage 50s.
 
 Republic of Korea Navy

See also
Otomat
AGM-158C LRASM
Atmaca
Harpoon
HAS-250
Kh-35
Naval Strike Missile
Naval anti ship missile -MR
Neptune
SSM-700K Haeseong
Type 80 Air-to-Ship Missile
Type 88 Surface-to-Ship Missile
Type 90 Ship-to-Ship Missile
Type 93 Air-to-Ship Missile
Sea Eagle
Sea Killer
YJ-83

References
Citations

Bibliography

External links

 Manufacturer's Website 
 Gallery of photographs of various variants of the Exocet missile 
 Argentine Account of the role of the Exocet in the Falklands War 
 Photos of Exocet damage to USS Stark 
 Testing of Exocet MM-40 Block 3 
 CSIS Missile Threat | Exocet 

Cold War anti-ship missiles of France
Anti-ship missiles of France
Military equipment introduced in the 1970s